Amber Rose Revah (born 24 June 1986) is a British actress, writer, and voice artist. 

She is best known for playing the roles of Dinah Madani in Marvel's The Punisher, Mika in MGM limited series Last Light and as Mary Magdalene in the box office hit Son of God. She played Leena in two seasons of the Channel 4 and PBS series Indian Summers with Julie Walters, and appeared in From Paris With Love opposite John Travolta. Her biological father is of Kenyan Indian heritage. Her maternal ancestry is both Polish and Italian.

Filmography

Film

Television

Video Games

References

External links
 

1986 births
Living people
English film actresses
English people of Polish-Jewish descent
English people of Kenyan descent
English people of Indian descent